Billy Hart Quartet is an album by American jazz drummer Billy Hart recorded in 2005 and released on the HighNote label.

Reception

AllMusic awarded the album 4 stars with its review by Ken Dryden stating, "Since this was a working band for some time prior to the making of Quartet, the musicians were already of one mind, rather than being thrown together and trying to make something out of brand new, unfamiliar charts. ...The interplay between the four men and the intensity of their individual solos leave no doubt that this quartet has earned a return trip to the studio for a follow-up session". All About Jazz's John Kelman said "Quartet may be a mainstream record, but it's a wholly modernistic one where Hart's group approaches the middle from a decidedly left-of-center point of view."

Track listing
All compositions by Billy Hart except as indicated
 "Mellow B" (Ethan Iverson) - 9:47  
 "Moment's Notice" (John Coltrane) - 4:31  
 "Charvez" - 7:34  
 "Confirmation" (Charlie Parker) - 7:32  
 "Lorca" - 8:42  
 "Irah" - 5:31  
 "Lullaby for Imke" - 6:10  
 "Iverson's Odyssey" (Mark Turner) - 8:19  
 "Neon" (Iverson) - 8:53

Personnel
Billy Hart - drums
Mark Turner - tenor saxophone
Ethan Iverson - piano
Ben Street - bass

References

HighNote Records albums
Billy Hart albums
2006 albums